Fruängen metro station is the end station on line 14 of the Stockholm metro, located in the district of Fruängen. The station was opened on 5 April 1964 as the south terminus of the first stretch of the Red line, from T-Centralen.

References

Red line (Stockholm metro) stations
Railway stations opened in 1964